A bass is a type of classical male singing voice and has the lowest vocal range of all voice types. According to The New Grove Dictionary of Opera, a bass is typically classified as having a vocal range extending from around the second E below middle C to the E above middle C (i.e., E2–E4). Its tessitura, or comfortable range, is normally defined by the outermost lines of the bass clef. Categories of bass voices vary according to national style and classification system.

Italians favour subdividing basses into the basso cantante (singing bass), basso buffo ("funny" bass), or the dramatic basso profondo (low bass). The American system identifies the bass-baritone, comic bass, lyric bass, and dramatic bass.

The German Fach system offers further distinctions: Spielbass (Bassbuffo), Schwerer Spielbass (Schwerer Bassbuffo), Charakterbass (Bassbariton), and Seriöser Bass. These classification systems can overlap. Rare is the performer who embodies a single Fach without also touching repertoire from another category.

History 
Cultural influence and individual variation create a wide variation in range and quality of bass singers. Parts for basses have included notes as low as the B-flat two octaves and a tone below middle C (B1), for example in Gustav Mahler's Symphony No. 2 and the Rachmaninov's All-Night Vigil, A below that in Frederik Magle's symphonic suite Cantabile, G below that (e.g. Measure 76 of Ne otverzhi mene by Pavel Chesnokov) or F below those in Kheruvimskaya pesn (Song of Cherubim) by Krzysztof Penderecki. Many basso profondos have trouble reaching those notes, and the use of them in works by Slavic composers has led to the colloquial term "Russian bass" for an exceptionally deep-ranged basso profondo who can easily sing these notes. Some traditional Russian religious music calls for A2 (110 Hz) drone singing, which is doubled by A1 (55 Hz) in the rare occasion that a choir includes exceptionally gifted singers who can produce this very low human voice pitch.

Many British composers such as Benjamin Britten have written parts for bass (such as the first movement of his choral work Rejoice in the Lamb) that center far higher than the bass tessitura as implied by the clef. The Harvard Dictionary of Music defines the range as being from the E below low C to middle C (i.e. E2–C4).

In choral music 

In SATB four-part mixed chorus, the bass is the lowest vocal range, below the tenor, alto, and soprano. Voices are subdivided into first bass and second bass with no distinction being made between bass and baritone voices, in contrast to the three-fold (tenor–baritone–bass) categorization of solo voices. The exception is in arrangements for male choir (TTBB) and barbershop quartets (TLBB), which sometimes label the lowest two parts baritone and bass.

Range and Subtypes 

Bass has the lowest vocal range of all voice types, with the lowest tessitura. The low extreme for basses is generally C2 (two Cs below middle C). Some extreme bass singers, referred to as basso profondos and oktavists, are able to reach much lower than this.Within opera, the lowest note in the standard bass repertoire is D2, sung by the character Osmin in Mozart's Die Entführung aus dem Serail, but few roles fall below F2. 

Although Osmin's note is the lowest 'demanded' in the operatic repertoire, lower notes are heard, both written and unwritten: for example, it is traditional for basses to interpolate a low C in the duet "Ich gehe doch rathe ich dir" in the same opera; in Richard Strauss' Der Rosenkavalier, Baron Ochs has an optional C2 ("Mein lieber Hippolyte"). The high extreme: a few bass roles in the standard repertoire call for a high F or G (F4 and G4, the one above middle C), but few roles go over F4. In the operatic bass repertoire, the highest notes are a G4 (The Barber in The Nose by Shostakovich) and, in the aria "Fra l'ombre e gl'orrori" in Handel's serenata Aci, Galatea e Polifemo, Polifemo reaches an A4.

Within the bass voice type category are seven generally recognized subcategories: basso cantante (singing bass), hoher bass (high bass), jugendlicher bass (juvenile bass), basso buffo ("funny" bass), Schwerer Spielbass (dramatic bass), lyric bass, and dramatic basso profondo (low bass).

Basso cantante/lyric high bass/lyric bass-baritone 

Basso cantante means "singing bass". Basso cantante is a higher, more lyrical voice. It is produced using a more Italianate vocal production, and possesses a faster vibrato, than its closest Germanic/Anglo-Saxon equivalent, the bass-baritone.

 Max, Le chalet by Adolphe Adam
 Duke Bluebeard Bluebeard's Castle by Béla Bartók
 Don Pizarro, Fidelio by Ludwig van Beethoven
 Count Rodolfo, La sonnambula by Bellini
 Blitch, Susannah by Carlisle Floyd
 Méphistophélès, Faust by Charles Gounod
 The King of Scotland, Ariodante by George Frideric Handel
 Don Alfonso, Così fan tutte by Wolfgang Amadeus Mozart
 Don Giovanni, Don Giovanni by Wolfgang Amadeus Mozart
 Figaro, The Marriage of Figaro by Wolfgang Amadeus Mozart
 The Voice of the Oracle, Idomeneo by Wolfgang Amadeus Mozart
 Silva, Ernani by Giuseppe Verdi
 Philip II, Don Carlos by Giuseppe Verdi
 Count Walter, Luisa Miller by Giuseppe Verdi
 Ferrando, Il trovatore by Giuseppe Verdi
 Daland, Der fliegende Holländer by Richard Wagner

Hoher Bass/dramatic high bass/dramatic bass-baritone 
 or "high bass" or often a dramatic bass-baritone.

 Igor, Prince Igor by Alexander Borodin
 Boris, Boris Godunov by Modest Mussorgsky
 Klingsor, Parsifal by Richard Wagner
 Wotan, Der Ring des Nibelungen by Richard Wagner
 Caspar, Der Freischütz by Carl Maria von Weber
 Banquo, Macbeth by Giuseppe Verdi
 Zaccaria, Nabucco by Giuseppe Verdi
 Fiesco, Simon Boccanegra by Giuseppe Verdi

Jugendlicher Bass 
 (juvenile bass) denotes the role of a young man sung by a bass, regardless of the age of the singer.
 Masetto, Don Giovanni by Wolfgang Amadeus Mozart
 Colline, La bohème by Giacomo Puccini

Basso buffo/lyric buffo 
Buffo, literally "funny", basses are lyrical roles that demand from their practitioners a solid coloratura technique, a capacity for patter singing and ripe tonal qualities if they are to be brought off to maximum effect. They are usually the blustering antagonist of the hero/heroine or the comic-relief fool in bel canto operas.

 Don Pasquale, Don Pasquale by Gaetano Donizetti
 Dottor Dulcamara, L'elisir d'amore by Gaetano Donizetti
 Doctor Bartolo, The Barber of Seville by Gioachino Rossini
 Don Magnifico, La Cenerentola by Gioachino Rossini
 Don Alfonso, Così fan tutte by Wolfgang Amadeus Mozart
 Leporello, Don Giovanni by Wolfgang Amadeus Mozart
 The Doctor, Wozzeck by Alban Berg

/dramatic buffo 
English equivalent: dramatic bass

 Khan Konchak, Prince Igor by Alexander Borodin
 Baculus, Der Wildschütz by Albert Lortzing
 Ferrando, Il trovatore by Giuseppe Verdi
 Daland, Der fliegende Holländer by Richard Wagner
 Varlaam, Boris Godunov by Modest Mussorgsky

Lyric basso profondo 

Basso profondo (lyric low bass) is the lowest bass voice type. According to J. B. Steane in Voices, Singers & Critics, the basso profondo voice "derives from a method of tone-production that eliminates the more Italian quick vibrato. In its place is a kind of tonal solidity, a wall-like front, which may nevertheless prove susceptible to the other kind of vibrato, the slow beat or dreaded wobble."

 Rocco, Fidelio by Ludwig van Beethoven
 Osmin, Die Entführung aus dem Serail by Wolfgang Amadeus Mozart
 Sarastro, Die Zauberflöte by Wolfgang Amadeus Mozart
 Pimen, Boris Godunov by Modest Mussorgsky
 Baron Ochs, Der Rosenkavalier by Richard Strauss
 Baldassarre, La favorite by Gaetano Donizetti

Dramatic basso profondo 
English equivalent: dramatic low bass. Dramatic basso profondo is a powerful basso profondo voice.

 Il Commendatore, Don Giovanni by Wolfgang Amadeus Mozart
 Hagen, Götterdämmerung by Richard Wagner
 Heinrich, Lohengrin by Richard Wagner
 Gurnemanz, Parsifal by Richard Wagner
 Fafner, Das Rheingold and Siegfried by Richard Wagner
 Marke, Tristan und Isolde by Richard Wagner
 Hunding, Die Walküre by Richard Wagner
 The Varangian (Viking) Guest, Sadko by Nikolai Rimsky-Korsakov
 The Grand Inquisitor, Don Carlo by Giuseppe Verdi
 Claggart, Billy Budd by Benjamin Britten

In Gilbert and Sullivan 
All of the Gilbert and Sullivan Savoy operas, except Patience and The Yeomen of the Guard, have at least one lead bass. Notable roles include: 

 Adam Goodheart, Ruddigore
 Arac, Princess Ida
 Bob Becket (Carpenter's mate), H.M.S. Pinafore
 Don Alhambra del Bolero, The Gondoliers
 The Mikado of Japan, The Mikado
 The Notary, The Sorcerer
 Private Willis, Iolanthe
 Sergeant of Police, The Pirates of Penzance

See also 
 Category of basses
 Fach, the German system for classifying voices
 Voice classification in non-classical music
 List of basses in non-classical music

References

External links 
 Guide to the singing voice, BBC Wales
 Basses in Bach’s vocal works
 
 

Voice types
Pitch (music)
Musical terminology
Opera terminology
Italian opera terminology
Choral music